Mark Kamphaus is a retired American football quarterback.

Kamphaus played high school football at Cincinnati's famed Moeller High School and went on to play college football at Boston College from 1986–89. After backing up Shawn Halloran his freshman year, he split the starting job with Mike Power in his Sophomore and Junior seasons and with Power and Willie Hicks in his senior year. His most famous victory was 38–24 upset over Army in the first ever Emerald Isle Classic.  He finished 6th all time in passing yards (2,422) and 3rd in completion percentage (57.1). 

He played one season in the Arena Football League with the Albany Firebirds. He completed 21 of 50 passes for 186 yards, 3 touchdowns, and 4 interceptions.

Year of birth missing (living people)
Living people
Players of American football from Cincinnati
American football quarterbacks
Boston College Eagles football players
Albany Firebirds players